The Aston Martin Rapide is a sports saloon car, built by the British marque Aston Martin from 2010 to 2020. It has four doors and four seats. It was first presented as a concept car at the North American International Auto Show in 2006 and the production version was shown at the 2009 Frankfurt Motor Show.

The Rapide name is a reference to the Lagonda Rapide, a four-door, four-seater saloon produced by Lagonda, now a part of Aston Martin. The new Rapide is the company's first 4-door fastback saloon since the Lagonda which was discontinued in 1990. The Rapide is based on the DB9 and is underpinned by the Aston Martin VH platform.

The first cars rolled off the production line in May 2010, initially built at a dedicated plant at the Magna Steyr facility in Graz, Austria. The factory initially planned to build 2,000 cars per year, but production was relocated to England in 2012 after sales did not meet production targets.

Models

Rapide (2010–2013)

Specifications
The car is rear-wheel drive and has a 6-speed Touchtronic II automatic transmission.

Equipment
The Rapide's standard features include a tilt-telescoping steering wheel, bi-xenon headlamps and LED taillamps. Leather and walnut wood trim with metallic accents; power front seats with memory, cooling and heating systems; Bluetooth; satellite radio (US version only); with USB and iPod connectivity. Other standard features include a Bang & Olufsen 16-speaker sound system with two tweeters that rise from the dashboard on activation of the system.

Design 
The Rapide was designed by stretching the design of the DB9 in order to accommodate an extra set of doors. Aston Martin design director, Marek Reichman has described a thoroughbred race horse as an inspiration, stating that he wanted muscles in the design to be visible through the skin.

The side windows of the car were made to appear like a single unit by using a black B pillar. The roof was designed to be as low as possible so it would mimic the design language of Aston Martin's model lineup. Due to the usage of swan doors and a low roof, the car is difficult for the accommodation of tall people. By comparison, the Porsche Panamera, a competitor of the Rapide, is 2.3 inches taller.

The rear flanks of the car are wider than those on the DB9, thus smoothening the extended roof design. The rear fenders and a curvaceous design language prevent the car as being perceived as stretched. The car makes use of rear lights and diffusers from the Vantage while the front headlamps are unique to the model. Although they would find use on the later Vanquish and the facelift DB9.

Rapide S (2013–2018)

Specifications
The Rapide S succeeded the standard Rapide in 2013. Carbon dioxide emissions are reduced by 23g/km to 332g/km.

The Rapide S received further revisions in 2014, with a new 8-speed Touchtronic III automatic transmission.

Rapide E (2019)

In 2015, Aston Martin was reported to be working on an all-electric version of the Rapide. The model named RapidE was confirmed for production at the 2018 Frankfurt Motor Show, the company revealed that the RapidE would go into production in the fourth quarter of 2019. The RapidE was designed to rival Porsche's Taycan electric saloon.

One hundred and fifty-five examples of the model were produced at Aston Martin's dedicated production facility located in St Athan, Wales where future all-electric Lagonda models are produced. Williams Advanced Engineering provided R&D assistance in the protype building and testing process with close involvement from interested customers.

The RapidE will be powered by a 65 kWh battery supplied by HyperBat Limited; a new joint venture between WAE and Unipart manufacturing group. The battery would be capable of 800-volt power transfers. Five thousand six hundred lithium-ion electric cells would be fitted in the engine bay along with two electric motors supplied by Integral Powertrain at the rear. Both of the motors will drive the car via an Xtrac transmission featuring a limited-slip differential. A new suspension system will be implemented to better cope with the changes in the drive train.

Maximum performance will be accessible regardless of battery charge. A prototype was tested at the Nürburgring to ensure that the car delivers linear power despite hard usage.

The car can also be charged on an 800-volt super charging station which increases the charging rate. The RapidE will be fitted with low-drag wheels and low-resistance Pirelli P Zero tyres for maximum efficiency. 

In January 2020, it was reported that the production of the Rapide E had been cancelled.

Rapide AMR (2018–2020)

In June 2018, Aston Martin unveiled the high-performance iteration of the Rapide called the Rapide AMR.

The 8-speed automatic transmission has also received recalibration for better shift timing. The car now comes standard with Michelin Pilot Supersport tyres and 21-inch alloy wheels, the biggest wheels ever fitted to an Aston Martin. The new model features carbon ceramic braking system with six piston calipers at the front and four piston calipers at the rear featuring 400 mm and 360 mm brake rotors front and aft. The car features a new front grille, "sprout" fog lamps and side sills, rear diffuser and bootlid made from carbon fibre.

Interior options include a One-77 steering wheel, a personalised plaque along with logos and a variety of colour schemes. Production was limited to 210 examples only.

Production and reception
Aston Martin opted to end its production by sub-contractor Magna Steyr in the middle of 2012, six years earlier than expected. Production of the car was also halted temporarily in May 2011. In the face of a diminishing market for luxury saloons, and to match output to shrinking sales, Aston Martin had to cut annual production from 2,000 to 1,250 in June 2011 – and was prepared to go as low as 500 annually. Rapide sales were a fraction of Aston Martin's more popular Vantage and Vanquish nameplates.

As a "four-door 'coupe' based on the DB9's architecture, built hastily to compete with Porsche's Panamera...in stark contrast to the homely-but-practical Panamera—its beguiling aesthetic is the cause of its limited four-up usefulness" with extremely cramped rear seats, as well as poor fuel economy from the V12 engine. The tagline of the Rapide was "Only four door sports car in the world" while the Panamera's was "first sports car for four" as the Panamera has "back seats, offering terrific kneeroom, a supportive (if hard) seat cushion, and generous headroom". Production of the Rapide ended in 2020 with the Rapide AMR as the final variant.

Motorsports

A Rapide was entered in the 2010 24 Hours of Nürburgring. Drivers included then Aston Martin CEO Ulrich Bez, journalist Matthew Marsh, the company’s Nürburgring Test Centre Director Wolfgang Schuhbauer and engineering manager Chris Porritt. It finished second in the SP 8 class and 34th overall. 

A Rapide S was entered in the 2013 24 Hours of Nürburgring. It was powered by a new technology introduced by Alset GmbH, a Hybrid Hydrogen system that enables the car to use hydrogen and petrol individually or at the same time in an internal combustion engine. This Rapide S was the first car to race the 24 Hours of Nürburgring with hydrogen fuel. It was driven by Ulrich Bez, Matthew Marsh, Wolfgang Schuhbauer and Shinichi Katsura and finished 114th overall. The car was part of its own class, E1-XP2.

Media

References

External links

Official Rapide Page

Rapide
Cars introduced in 2009
2010s cars
Full-size vehicles
Executive cars
Luxury vehicles
Sports sedans
Hatchbacks
Flagship vehicles
Cars of Austria